Styphlotrematidae is a family of trematodes belonging to the order Plagiorchiida.

Genera:
 Styphlotrema Odhner, 1910

References

Plagiorchiida